Words of Arabic origin entered the French language. Most of them entered first in another Romance language before being borrowed by the French language. These languages are mainly Italian (and its dialects), Medieval Latin and Hispanic (Castilian, Catalan, Portuguese). A little number of words, mainly slang words (argot) came finally through dialectal arab of the French colonies in North-Africa.

A
 abricot' ("apricot") : from Catalan albercoc, derived from the Arabic al barqūq (أَلْبَرْقُوق) which is itself borrowed from Late Greek praikokkion derived from Latin præcoquum, meaning "(the) early fruit"
 adoble ("adobe") : from Spanish adobe, derived from the Arabic al-ṭūb (الطوب) meaning "(the) brick of dried earth"
 albacore ("albacore") (zoo.) : from Latin American Spanish albacora, itself from Maroccan Arabic bakûra "young bonito (kind of fish)"
 alcade ("alcade", "Spanish magistrate, Spanish judge"), from Spanish alcade "magistrate, judge", itself from Arabic al-qāḍi (القاض) "the judge; the cadi".
 alchimie ("alchemy"): from Medieval Latin alchimia, itself from Arabic al Kīmíj̄a or al kîmiâ (الكيمياء), possibly from either Greek or Coptic source according to current hypotheses
 alcool ("alcohol"), double origin : Scholar Latin and Spanish alcohol, from Arabic kuḥúl (الكحول)
 alcôve ("alcove): from Spanish alcoba, itself from Arabic al qubba (القبة) "cupola"
 alambic ("still"): from Medieval Latin alambicus, itself from Arabic al−anbīq or al-inbīq (الإنبيق) meaning "(the) still for the distillation of alcohol". The invention of the still is traced to Ptolemaic Egypt. The original Greek word ἄμβιξ (ambix), meaning "the top of a still" had the definite article al- added onto it by the Arabs.
 alezan (horse: chestnut, sorrel) : from Spanish alazán, probably Arabic  ﺃﺻﹿﻬﹷﺐ [’aṣhab]
 algèbre (algebra): from Medieval Latin algebra, itself from Arabic al-ǧabr or al-jabr الجبر meaning "amending or fixation", a root (linguistics) of the word Arabic word of 'splint' jabirah جبيرة
 algorithme ("algorithm"): scholar form from Old French augorisme, itself from Old Spanish alguarismo, from  Al Ḫuwārizmī, nickname of mathematician al-Khwarizmi الخوارزمي
 alidade : from Medieval Latin alhidada, alidada "rule of the astrolab", itself from Arabic al idāda
 almanach ("almanac") : from Medieval Latin almanach "calendar" from the Spain Arabic al manāḫ "calendar", المناخ , itself from Syriac l-manhaï "next year"
 amalgame ("mixture", "blend", "amalgam") : from Medieval Latin amalgama alterated form of Arabic al-ḡamâa  الملغم
 ambre ("amber") : from  Medieval Latin ambar / ambra, itself from Arabic anbar عنبر
 amiral ("admiral") : from Arabic amīr al-'ālī "higher chief" or amīr-ar-rahl "fleet commander" أمير البحر
 aniline ("aniline") from German Anilin, scholar derivation of alin "purple dye", itself from Portuguese anil borrowed from Arabic an‑nīl (النيلة (صبغة
 arrobe ("at sign"): from Spanish arroba.
 arsenal ("arsenal") : from Italian (Venitian) arzana with final -l from an older tarsenal, tersenal, borrowed from Italian (cf. Napolitan tarcenale), themselves from Arabic dâr-sinâ or dār as-inā دار الصناعة
 artichaut ("artichoke") : from Italian articiocco, related to Spanish alcachofa, from Spain Arabic haršûfa (Classical Arabic ḥáršafa) أرضي شوكي
 assassin ("assassin") : from Italian assassino, assessino, borrowed from unattested Arabic plural *Hashīshiyyīn "hashish smokers", derived of hašiš > hashish  حشاشين
 aubergine ("aubergine") : from Catalan alberginía, itself from Arabic al bādinǧān, from Persian bātinǧān, ultimatly from Sanskrit bhantaki.  البادنحات - الباذنجان
 avarie ("damage on a ship, vehicle or its cargo") : from Medieval Latin (Genova, Italy) avaria, itself from Arabic àwārīya, derived form of àwār "mistake, lack". (عوار (تالف
 azimut ("azimuth") : from Spanish acimut, itself from Arabic sumût, plural of samt "path, way" السمت 
 azur ("azure") : from Medieval Latin azurium, itself from lāzaward "lapis lazuli" (cf. Judeo-French Lazur), borrowed from Persian lāzward.  لازورد

B
 babouche (slippers) بلغة
 baldaquin (baldachin)
 barkhane (barchan)
 baobab  بو حباب
 baroud (raid) بارود
 benjoin (benzoin resin)
 benzine البنزين
 bergamote (bergamot orange) برتقال
 bezef (much, many), usually used in the negative form:  (not much, not many)
 bled (colloquial: Place, Town) بلد
 borax بوراق
 bougie (candle) from Bejaia (بجاية, port town in Algeria), but not particularly Arabic

C
 cafard (cockroach)
 café ("coffee", "café"): from Italian (Venice) caffè or / and from Turkish qahve, itself from Arabic qahwah قهوة
 caïd (chief of a mob; as a nickname, can be translated as "tiger") قائد
 calfeutrer (to draught-proof)
 calibre (standard for calibration, calibre, see also Caliper) قالب
 calife (caliph) خليفة
 camaïeu (camaieu)
 camphre (camphor) كافور
 candie ("Heraklion") قند (من سكر قندي)
 carafe (water pot) غرافة
 carat (gem mass or metal purity) قيراط
 carmin ("carmine") قرمزي
 caroussel ("carousel") كروي
 carvi ("caraway") كراوية
 chèque ("check") : from English check, itself from Old French eschec / echec (French échec), alterated form of Latin scacus from Arabic  صك, from Persian šāh, mixed up with Old Low Franconian *skāk "booty" (cf. German Schach)
 chiffre ("number", see Cipher) : from Arabic ṣifr  صفر
 chouïa (slang for "a little") شوية
 civette ("chives", "civet") : probably from Catalan civetta, itself from Arabic zabād قط الزبّاد
 clebs (slang for "dog") كلاب
 coton ("cotton") : from Italian cotone, itself from Arabic  قطن
 cramoisi ("crimson") : alteration of Italian cremisi, itself from Arabic qirmizī "colour of the cochineal" قرمزي
 cuscute

D
 divan ديوان
 douane ("customs") : from Old Italian doana, dovana, itself from Vulgar Arabic *duwān, alteration of  dīwān, from Persian dīwān "customs"
 drogoman ترجمان

E
 écarlate       أقر طي 
 échec (jeu d'échecs)
 éden عدن
 élixir الإكسير
 émir أمير
 épinard ("spinach") : maybe from Old Occitan spinarch, itself from Medieval Latin spinarchia, spinachium, borrowed from Spain Arabic isbināḫ, for asfanāḫ, isfināḫ, isfānâḫ, itself from Persian aspanāḫ, aspanāǧ, asfināǧ (FEW t. 19, pp. 11-12).
 erg     عرق

F
 fakir فقير
 fanfare ثرثار (brass band)
 fanfaron From Spanish fanfarrón (boaster)
 felouque (felucca) فلك ـ الفلك التي تجري في البحر
 flouze (slang for money) فلوس

G
 gabelle
 gala : from Spanish gala
 gaze   غاز
 gazelle : from Arabic ghazâl (غزال)
 gazette : from Italian gazetta   غازات
 genette
 gerboise    قرمزي
 gilet
 girafe: from Italian giraffa, from Arabic zarâfah (زرافة)
 goudron قطران
 goule غول
 guitare : from Spanish guitarra, itself from Arabic قيثارة
 guitoune

H
 hammam: from Arabic  حمّام bathroom
 harem حرم
 hasard زهر النرد (Dice)
 haschisch: from Arabic  حشسيش grass
 henné: from Arabic:  حنّة

J
 jarre جرة
 jasmin ياسمين
 jupe, jupon : from south Italian jupa "jacket" (Medieval Latin juppum), variant form of Italian giubba, itself from Arabic ǧubba « جبة

K
 Kif-Kif كيف ـ كيف (the same)
 kermès قرمز
 kohol كحول

L
 laiton
 laque
 lascar
 lilas    الياف
 limonade ليموناضة
 loukoum حلقوم
 luth عود

M
 maboule (mad, crazy) مهبول
 macramé مقرمة (macrame)
 magasin (مخزن (مغازة  magazine
 marabout   خرابط
 marcassite مرقشيثا (marcasite)
 maroquin  المغرب morocco
 massepain  (مرزبانية (حلوى لوز وسكر (Marzipan)
 massicot  مقصلة (guillotine)
 matelas    مطرح
 matraque مطرقة
 méchoui    مشوي
 mesquin مسكين
 mohair (المخيّر (موهير (mohair)
 moire, moiré
 momie مومياء (Mummy)
 mosquée مسجد
 mouchtefert
 mousseline موصلي (Muslin)
 mousson موسم (monsoon)
 mulâtre
 muscade

N
 nabab نائب
 nacre نقر
 nadir نظير
 naphte نفط
 natron النطرون
 nénufar
 noria
 nouba نوبة

O
 orange نارنج
 ouate

P
 pastèque بطيخ

R
 raquette الراحة
 razzia غزوة
 récif رصيف
 riz ارز

S
 saccharine سكر
 safari سفاري
 safran زعفران
 salamalec  السلام عليكم
 santal صندل
 saphir صفير
 sarbacane زربطانة
 satin  from Arabic الزيتون a city in China called Citong
 savate سبّاط (Savate)
 séné (نبات السنا)
 sirop شراب
 smala زملة
 sofa صُفّة
 sorbet from Persian شربة (from Arabic شراب(syrup))
 soude الصودا (Soda)
 souk سوق
 sucre سكر
 sultan سلطان

T
 taffetas : التفتة taffeta 
 talc : طلق (ṭalq)
 talisman : طلسم (ṭilasm)
 tare : طرح (ṭarḥ)
 tarif : تعريفة (taʿrīfa)
 timbale : طبل (ṭabl)
 toubib : طبيب (ṭabīb) (doctor)
 truchement : ترجمان (tarjumān)

V
 varan
 vizir وزير

Z
 zénith السمت
 zéro   صفر

See also
 Influence of Arabic on other languages
 List of English words of Arabic origin
 List of French loanwords in Persian
 List of Portuguese words of Arabic origin
 List of Spanish words of Arabic origin

References

External links

French language
Arabic language
Arabic words and phrases